

See also 
 United States House of Representatives elections, 1802 and 1803
 List of United States representatives from Connecticut

Notes 

1802
Connecticut
United States House of Representatives